Lukáš Švrček (born 11 September 1990) is a professional Slovak footballer who currently plays for Fortuna Liga club Skalica as a midfielder.

Club career

MFK Skalica
He made his professional Fortuna Liga debut for Skalica against Ružomberok on 18 July 2015.

References

External links
 MFK Skalica profile
 
 Futbalnet profile
 Eurofotbal profile

1990 births
Living people
Slovak footballers
Association football midfielders
MFK Skalica players
2. Liga (Slovakia) players